X-MO is a Dutch language premium digital cable specialty channel from the Netherlands. X-MO offers all gay male pornography films. X-MO broadcasts 24 hours a day.

See also
 Television in the Netherlands
 Digital television in the Netherlands

External links
 XMO website 

Gay pornographic television channels
Television channels in the Netherlands
LGBT-related mass media in the Netherlands
Television channels and stations established in 2008
Mass media in Utrecht (city)